List of adventive wild plants in Israel refers to species of vascular plants in Israel that were either introduced there by human activity or are of a cultivated origin, and meet at least one of the following criteria:
species which have reached a self-propagating (naturalized) status in Israel, reproducing without further human intervention 
species that appear in natural habitats  
cultivated species that escape from cultivation or persist long after being abandoned

The first table lists species which are unquestionably non-indigenous to Israel; a second table lists species whose native distribution in Israel is questionable.

Adventive species

Questionable native distribution

See also
List of endemic flora of Israel
Wildlife of Israel
Tourism in Israel
Jerusalem Botanical Gardens

References

Further reading
Dafni, Amots, and David Heller, Adventive flora of Israel - phytogeographical, ecological and agricultural aspects, Plant Systematics and Evolution 140:1–18 (1982).
Dafni, Amots, and David Heller, Invasions of adventive plants in Israel, in Di Castri, Francesco, A. J. Hansen, and M. Debussche [eds.], Biological invasions in Europe and the Mediterranean Basin, Springer, 1990, pp. 135–160. 
Dafni, Amots, and David Heller, The threat posed by alien weeds in Israel, Weed research 20(5):277–283 (1980).
Danin, Avinoam, Current inventory of introduced species new to the flora of Israel, A symphosium on biological invasions in Israeli ecosystems - lecture abstracts and lists of invasive species, Department of Geography and Environmental Development, Ben-Gurion University of the Negev, 2005 (Hebrew).
Danin, Avinoam, The nomenclature news of Flora Palaestina, updated version as of 2006, Flora of Israel Online, retrieved October 2008. First published in Flora Mediterranea 10:109–172 (2000). 
Dufour-Dror, Jean-Marc, Biogeography and Ecology in the Eastern Mediterranean, retrieved October 2008.
Dufour-Dror, Jean-Marc, Invasive Plant Species in Protected and Open Areas in the Central District, Israeli Ministry of the Environment and the Jerusalem Institute for Israel Studies, 2005 (Hebrew).
Feinbrun-Dothan, Naomi, and Avinoam Danin, Analytical flora of Eretz-Israel, second edition, CANA, Jerusalem, 1998 (Hebrew).  
Fragman, Ori, Uzi Pltimann, David Heller and Avi Shmida, Checklist and ecological data-base of the flora of Israel and its surroundings. Israel Nature and National Parks Protection Authority, The National Herbarium of The Hebrew University in Jerusalem, and ROTEM - Israel plant information center. 1999.
Shmida, Avi, MAPA's dictionary of plants and flowers in Israel, MAPA publishers, 2005 (Hebrew).
Flora of Israel Online, the Hebrew University in Jerusalem, retrieved October 2008.

Environmental issues in Israel
Nature conservation in Israel
Introduced plants
Adventive
Israel